Zeba is an Afghan lifestyle and entertainment magazine based in Vienna, Virginia, USA. The magazine is published by a company with the same name, Zeba Magazine, Inc.

History and profile
The first issue of Zeba was published in June 2006. The magazine has three editions, English, Dari and Pashto. It has an office in Washington, D.C., United States. Currently distribution areas are set for the highest populated European communities in the United States, Canada and nationally in Germany, Sweden and Australia. The magazine attracts a wide variety of the younger and older  generations.

References

Lifestyle magazines published in the United States
English-language magazines
Entertainment magazines published in the United States
Magazines established in 2006
Magazines published in Virginia
Multilingual magazines